Maurice Schutz (4 August 1866 – 22 March 1955) was a French film actor.

He starred in some 91 films between 1918 and 1952.

Selected filmography
 Quatre-vingt-treize (1920)
 Au-delà des lois humaines (1920)
 The Three Masks (1921)
 Tillers of the Soil (1923)
 Little Jacques (1923)
 The Phantom of the Moulin Rouge (1925)
 Montmartre (1925)
 Jean Chouan (1926)
 The Imaginary Voyage (1926)
 Napoléon (1927)
 The Passion of Joan of Arc (1928)
 Verdun: Visions of History (1928)
 Venus (1929)
 A Foolish Maiden (1929)
 The Devil's Holiday (1931)
 Vampyr (1932)
 Fantômas (1932)
 Pasteur (1935)
 The Call of Silence (1936)
 The Assault (1936)
 Three Waltzes (1938)
 Gargousse (1938)
 The Novel of Werther (1938)
 La Symphonie fantastique (1942)
 Jeannou (1943)
 The Captain (1946)
 The Murderer is Not Guilty (1946)
 The Village of Wrath (1947)
Coincidences (1947)
 The Lost Village (1947)
 The Lame Devil (1948, Le Diable boiteux)
 Return to Life (1949)
 Miquette (1950)
 Adémaï au poteau-frontière (1950)
 Boîte à vendre (1951)
 Good Enough to Eat (1951)

References

External links 

Maurice Schutz at BFI

1866 births
1955 deaths
Male actors from Paris
French male film actors
French male silent film actors
20th-century French male actors